A creative work is a manifestation of creative effort including fine artwork (sculpture, paintings, drawing, sketching, performance art), dance, writing (literature), filmmaking, and composition.

Legal definitions

Creative works require a creative mindset and are not typically rendered in an arbitrary fashion although some works demonstrate [have in common] a degree of arbitrariness, such that it is improbable that two people would independently create the same work. At its base, creative work involves two main steps – having an idea, and then turning that idea into a substantive form or process. The creative process can involve one or more individuals. Typically the creative process has some aesthetic value that is identified as a creative expression which itself generally invokes external stimuli which a person views as creative.
The term is frequently used in the context of copyright.

United Kingdom 
For the purpose of section 221(2)(c) of the Income Tax (Trading and Other Income) Act 2005, the expression "creative works" means:

References

Copyright law
 Creative works
Creativity